The Umbri were an Italic people of ancient Italy. A region called Umbria still exists and is now occupied by Italian speakers. It is somewhat smaller than the ancient Umbria.

Most ancient Umbrian cities were settled in the 9th-4th centuries BC on easily defensible hilltops. Umbria was bordered by the Tiber and Nar rivers and included the Apennine slopes on the Adriatic. The ancient Umbrian language is a branch of a group called Oscan-Umbrian, which is related to the Latino-Faliscan languages.

Origins
They are also called Ombrii in some Roman sources. Ancient Roman writers thought the Umbri to be of Gaulish origin;  wrote that they were descended from an ancient Gaulish tribe. Similarly Roman historian Cato the Elder, in his masterpiece Origines, defines the Gauls as "the progenitors of the Umbri". The Ambrones are also mentioned, with the Lombards and the Suebi, among the tribes of Northern Europe in the poem Widsith. 

Pliny the Elder wrote concerning the folk-etymology of the name: 

Ancient Greek historians considered the Umbri as the ancestors of the Sabellian people, namely the Sabines and the Samnites, and the tribes which sprung from them, as the Marsi, Marrucini, Peligni, Picentes, Hirpini, and others. Their expansion was in a southward direction, according to the rite of Ver Sacrum.

Culture
Lepontic inscriptions have also been found in Umbria, in the area which saw the emergence of the Terni culture, which had strong similarities with the Celtic-speaking cultures of Hallstatt and La Tène. The Umbrian necropolis of Terni, which dates back to the 10th century BC, was virtually identical in every aspect to the Celtic necropolis of the Golasecca culture.

Religion

During the 6th–4th centuries BC, Umbrian communities constructed rural sanctuaries in which they sacrificed to the gods. Bronze votives shaped as animals or deities were also offered. Umbrian deities include Feronia, Valentia, Minerva Matusia and Clitumnus. The Iguvine Tablets were discovered in 1444 at Scheggia, near Gubbio, Italy. Composed during the 2nd or 3rd centuries BC, they describe religious rituals involving animal sacrifice.

The ancient sanctuary to Venus (or her Umbrian equivalent) at Hispellum was an important sacred place for Umbrian tribes from the 3rd c. BC and the site was monumentalised in the Republican age (2nd-1st century BC).

The modern Festival of Ceri, celebrated every year in Gubbio on May 15 in honor of Bishop Ubald or Ubaldo of Gubbio (1084-1160), shares certain features with the rites described in the 3rd c. BC Iguvine tables mentioned above, and so may be a survival of that ancient pre-Christian custom. It is also celebrated in Jessup, PA, a town with a large number of immigrants from the Gubbio area, as Saint Ubaldo Day.

Political structure
While we have little direct information about ancient Umbrian political structure, it is fairly clear that two men held the supreme magistracy of uhtur and were responsible for supervising rituals. Other civic offices included the marone, which had a lower status than uhtur (closely related to Latin auctor whence English "author"), and a religious position named kvestur (cognate to or a borrowing of Latin Quaestor). The Umbrian social structure was divided into distinct groups probably based upon military rank. During the reign of Augustus, four Umbrian aristocrats became senators. Emperor Nerva’s family was from Umbria.

According to Guy Jolyon Bradley, " The religious sites of the region have been thought to reveal a society dominated by agricultural and pastoral concerns, to which town life came late in comparison to Etruria."

Roman influence
Throughout the 9th-4th centuries BC, imported goods from Greece and Etruria were common, as well as the production of local pottery.

The Romans first made contact with Umbria in 310 BC and settled Latin colonies there in 299 BC, 268 BC and 241 BC. They had completed their conquest of Umbria by approximately 260 BC. Incorporation into the Roman state occurred during the 3rd century BC when some Umbri were given full citizenship or citizenship without the right to vote. Also during the 3rd century BC about 40,000 Romans settled in the region. The Via Flaminia linking areas of Umbria was complete by 220 BC. Cities in Umbria also contributed troops to Rome for its many wars. Umbrians fought under Scipio Africanus in 205 BC during the Second Punic War. The Praetorian Guard recruited from Etruria and Umbria. The Umbri played a minor role in the Social War and as a result were granted citizenship in 90 BC. Roman veterans were settled in Umbria during the reign of Augustus.

Archaeological sites

The Umbrians descend from the culture of Terni, protohistoric facies of southern Umbria. 
The towns of Chianciano and Clusium (Umbrian: Camars) near modern Arezzo contain traces of Umbrian habitation dating to the 7th or 8th centuries BC. Terni (in Latin: Interamna Nahars) was the first important Umbrian center. Its population was called with the name of Umbri Naharti. They were the largest, organized and belligerent tribe of the Umbrians and populated compactly across the basin of Nera River. This people are quoted for 8 times in the Iguvine Tablets. Their importance is confirmed not only by the Iguvine Tablets and Latin historians, and by the important and privileged role played by this city in Roman times, but also by the discovery, at the end of the 19th and early 20th centuries, of one of the larger mixed burial necropoleis (Urnfield culture and burial fields) in Europe, about 3000 tombs (Necropoli delle Acciaierie di Terni).

Assisi, called Asisium by the Romans, was an ancient Umbrian site on a spur of Mount Subasio.  Myth relates that the city was founded by Dardanus in 847 BC.

Perugia and Orvieto are not considered of Umbrian but Etruscan origin. According to the geographical distribution of the Umbrian territory, they are located on the left side of the Tiber River, which is part of the ancient Etruria. Umbri were on the opposite side of the river. According to the map of Regio Umbria and Ager Galliucus by Emperor Augustus , the major Umbrian city-states were: Terni, Todi, Amelia and Spoleto (the current part of southern Umbria).

Prominent Umbri

Gentes of Umbrian origin 
 Accia gens
 Annaea gens
 Belliena gens
 Cocceia gens
 Fuficia gens
 Luciena gens
 Peducaea gens
 Propertia gens
 Rustia gens
 Scoedia gens
 Sibidiena gens
 Titulena gens
 Ulpia gens
 Umbrena gens
 Umbria gens
 Umbricia gens

Romans of Umbrian ancestry 
 Nerva, Roman emperor
 Trajan, Roman emperor
 Seneca the Elder, rhetorician and writer
 Seneca the Younger, Stoic philosopher, statesman and dramatist

Genetics
A 2020 analysis of maternal haplogroups from ancient and modern samples indicated a substantial genetic similarity among the modern inhabitants of Umbria and the area's ancient pre-Roman inhabitants, and evidence of substantial genetic continuity in the region from pre-Roman times to the present with regard to mitochondrial DNA. Both modern and ancient Umbrians were found to have high rates of mtDNA haplogroups U4 and U5a, and an overrepresentation of J (at roughly 30%). The study also found that, "local genetic continuities are further attested to by six terminal branches (H1e1, J1c3, J2b1, U2e2a, U8b1b1 and K1a4a)" also shared by ancient and modern Umbrians.

See also 
Umbrian language
List of ancient peoples of Italy
Gens of Sabine origin
Gens of Volscian origin

References

Sources
 

Socii
History of le Marche
History of Umbria
Umbri